Mathilde Doudoux (born 28 December 1996) is a French BMX rider, representing her nation at international competitions. She competed in the time trial event and race event at the 2015 UCI BMX World Championships.

References

External links
 
 

1996 births
Living people
BMX riders
French female cyclists
Place of birth missing (living people)
Sportspeople from Bayonne
Cyclists from Nouvelle-Aquitaine